Josette Day (Paris, July 31, 1914 – Paris, June 27, 1978) was a French film actress.

Born Josette Noële Andrée Claire Dagory, she began her career as a child actress in 1919 at the age of five. When she was 18, Day was the mistress of Paul Morand and later was in a relationship with famous French writer and director Marcel Pagnol, whom she met in January 1939 and lasted part of World War II. She did not marry him.

In 1946, she played her best-known role, alongside Jean Marais, as Belle in Jean Cocteau's 1946 film Beauty and the Beast.

Her films include Allo Berlin? Ici Paris! (1932), The Merry Monarch (based on Les Aventures du roi Pausole) (1933), Lucrèce Borgia (1935), L'homme du jour (1937), Accord final (1938), La Belle et la Bête (1946) and Les Parents terribles (1948).

Despite numerous parts in famous French films, Day ended her career as an actress in 1950 when only 36 years old. She retired to marry wealthy chemical businessman Maurice Solvay (descendant of Ernest Solvay, founder of the notable Solvay company). In February 1959, while on cruise in the Pacific, she and Solvay met a Tahitian girl at a Papeete market named Hinano Tiatia, whom the couple took under legal guardianship and who was the center of Solvay's inheritance dispute having not been adopted at the time of his sudden death in 1960.

Selected filmography
 Here's Berlin (1932)
 The Regiment's Champion (1932)
 Miss Helyett (1933)
 The Barber of Seville (1933)
 The Concierge's Daughters (1934)
 Antonia (1935)
 Lucrezia Borgia (1935)
 Women's Club (1936)
 The Flame (1936)
 Ménilmontant (1936)
 The Man of the Hour (1937)
 The Patriot (1938)
 The Five Cents of Lavarede (1939)
 Monsieur Brotonneau (1939)
 The Well-Digger's Daughter (1940)
 Arlette and Love (1943)
Beauty and the Beast (1946)
 Les Parents terribles (1948)
 Swiss Tour (1950)

References

External links

Photographs and literature

1914 births
1978 deaths
Actresses from Paris
French child actresses
French silent film actresses
French film actresses
20th-century French actresses